The men's 85 kilograms event at the 2015 World Weightlifting Championships was held on 24 and 25 November 2015 in Houston, United States.

Schedule

Medalists

Records

 Andrei Rybakou's world record was rescinded in 2016.

Results

References

Results 

2015 World Weightlifting Championships